Maylada Susri or Bow (โบว์) is a Thai singer, actress and model. She was a singer in the girl group Kiss Me Five from 2010 to 2013. After winning Thai Supermodel Contest in 2013, she signed with Channel 7 to become one of their exclusive actresses until May 2020. In June 2020, she officially signed with Channel 3. She's known for her roles in Yai Kanlaya, Norah, Hong Neur Mongkorn 2017, Pachara Montra and Mon Garn Bandan Ruk.

Career
Bow began her career by attending the Smart Kids Contest in 2004. In 2010, she debuted as a singer under Kamikaze as a member of the girl group Kiss Me Five, alongside Kitty Chicha, Bam Pakakanya, Gail Natcha and Mild Krittiya. When the group disbanded in 2013, she joined Thai Supermodel Contest in 2013 and finished in first place.. She later signed with Channel 7 where her first acting role was in the drama Khat Chueak, where she was acting alongside Mick Tongraya. However, her second drama Yai Kanlaya, where she was paired up with Michael Pataradet aired first and made both of them become famous and tied as "Koojin" (Fantasy Couple). She won various awards during her time in Channel 7.

In June 2020 she signed a contract with Channel 3. Her first drama was Monrak Nong Phak Kayaeng, where she paired up with Nadech Kugimiya.

On 2 December 2021, Maylada's new movie "OM! Cruch On Me!", an action drama, rom-com and fantasy movie, with James Jirayu Tangsrisuk, will be released.

Personal life
Bow is a close friend of Thanaerng Kanyawee Songmuang and Nychaa Nuttanicha Dungwattanawanich.

Filmography

Film

Television series

Music video appearances

Discography

Soundtrack appearances

Awards and nominations

References

External links
 Maylada Susri on Channel 7
 

1996 births
Living people
Maylada Susri
Maylada Susri
Maylada Susri
Maylada Susri
Maylada Susri
Maylada Susri